Érize-la-Brûlée is a commune in the Meuse department in Grand Est in north-eastern France.

It is located 80 km south-west of Metz and north-west of Nancy. Nearby settlements include Érize-Saint-Dizier, Rumont, Raival, Érize-la-Petite, and Chaumont-sur-Aire.

Its name derives from the name of the local river L'Ezrule (in Latin, Ericia). The suffix 'la-Brûlée', meaning 'burnt', may date back to 1247 when the village was destroyed by invaders.

See also
Communes of the Meuse department

References

Communes of Meuse (department)